Antonio Felipe Díaz (1789–1869) was a Uruguayan general and politician, who participated in the Argentine War of Independence and the Guerra Grande in the Banda Oriental. He was also a writer and journalist, author of several newspapers, including El Correo Nacional and El Defensor de la Independencia Americana.

He briefly served as a cabinet minister during the presidency of Manuel Oribe in 1838, during his term as president of the Cerrito, serving as Minister of Finance and of War and the Navy of Uruguay.

Born in La Coruña, Spain, as the son of Domingo Díaz de Castañón and Manuela Hernández de Miera, he belonged to a distinguished Spanish family established in Buenos Aires and Montevideo. He was married to María Dionisia Gómez Soriano, daughter of José Gómez Soriano and Cayetana Tadea Torres.

References 

1789 births
1869 deaths
Uruguayan generals
People from Buenos Aires
National Party (Uruguay) politicians
People from Montevideo
Federales (Argentina)
Uruguayan autobiographers